The Marshallese passport is an international travel document that is issued to Marshallese citizens.

Physical appearance
 The Marshall Islands passport includes the following data:
 Photo of passport holder
 Code of issuing state (MHL)
 Passport number
 Name of the holder
 Name of the issuing state (Republic of the Marshall Islands)
 Date of birth of the passport holder
 Sex
 Place of Birth
 Date of issue
 Date of expiry
 Issuing authority

Visa requirements

As of March 2023, Marshallese citizens had visa-free or visa on arrival access to 123 countries and territories, ranking the Marshallese passport 87th in terms of travel freedom (tied with the Colombian, North Macedonian and Tuvaluan) according to the Henley visa restrictions index.

Marshall Islands signed a mutual visa waiver agreement with Schengen Area countries on 28 June 2016.

See also
Visa requirements for Marshallese citizens

References

External links
 RMI Passport Application Instructions
 RMI Passport Application

Marshall Islands
Government of the Marshall Islands
Foreign relations of the Marshall Islands